Pavlo Khnykin (born April 5, 1969) is a retired freestyle swimmer from Vinnytsia, Ukraine. He was born in Sverdlovsk, Russian SFSR.

He competed in four consecutive Summer Olympics, starting in 1992 for the Unified Team. He won the silver medal in the men's 4×100 m freestyle relay at the 1992 Summer Olympics, alongside Gennadiy Prigoda, Yury Bashkatov and Alexander Popov.

References
 Profile with image 
 

1969 births
Living people
Sportspeople from Yekaterinburg
Soviet male swimmers
Ukrainian male swimmers
Olympic swimmers of the Unified Team
Olympic swimmers of Ukraine
Swimmers at the 1992 Summer Olympics
Swimmers at the 1996 Summer Olympics
Swimmers at the 2000 Summer Olympics
Swimmers at the 2004 Summer Olympics
Olympic silver medalists for the Unified Team
Ukrainian male freestyle swimmers
European Aquatics Championships medalists in swimming
Sportspeople from Vinnytsia
Medalists at the 1992 Summer Olympics
Olympic silver medalists in swimming
Universiade medalists in swimming
Universiade bronze medalists for Ukraine